Coming of Age is a R&B quintet group that consist of Israel Spencer, Tao Kese, Terrance Quaites, Ivan Shaw and Maranthony Tabb. The group signed to Atlantic Records in the 1990s. Their self-titled debut album was released in 1993 and peaked in the top ten of the Billboard Top Heatseakers chart. Their debut single "Coming Home to Love" peaked at number twenty-seven on the US chart, their follow up in 1994 "Baby Be Still" peaked at number sixty-three.

In 1994, the group appeared with Tisha Campbell and De La Soul on Soul Train.

Discography

Albums

Singles

References

External links
[] Album and singles info, chart info and music video links.

African-American musical groups
American contemporary R&B musical groups
Zoo Entertainment (record label) artists